Marilyn Barrueta was inducted into the National Teachers Hall of Fame in 2005 after 48 years of teaching. Since 1978, "Señora Barrueta" has taught Spanish 1-6, advanced placement Spanish, and Spanish for Fluent Speakers at Yorktown High School in Arlington, Virginia in the United States.

History
Prior to her career at Yorktown, Marilyn Barrueta taught Spanish 1-3, English, English as a Second Language, Math, Social Studies, at Stratford Junior High in Arlington, Virginia from 1957 to 1978. During that time, from 1961 to 1972, she taught summer school sessions in Arlington, in addition to Spanish Adult Education for Arlington County Adult Education from 1958 to 1961.

She died on November 4, 2010.

Honors
Other of Marilyn Barrueta's many honors include: 

 2000 Distinguished Educator, The Governor’s School, Richmond, Virginia
 1994-1997 Nationally elected to the Executive Council of the American Council on the Teaching of Foreign Languages
 1987 Yorktown High School Recognition Award for Professional Involvement and Contributions to the Profession
 1985 Yorktown Faculty Award for Work with Students
 1984 Greater Washington Association of Teachers of Foreign Language Recognition Award for Service to the Profession
 1983 Yorktown Faculty Award for Work with Students
 1954-1957 Phi Beta Kappa
 1954-1957 University of Illinois Mortar Board
 1954-1957 Phi Kappa Phi
 1954-1957 Alpha Lambda Delta
 1954-1957 Scholarship Key
 1954-1957 Class Honors upper 10%

Academic background
 University of Virginia Graduate Work 2001, 2000, 1999, 1991, 1989, 1988, 1986, 1962, 1961
 George Mason University Graduate Work 1991, 1986, 1985, 1984, 1977
 William and Mary Graduate Work 1993
 Johns Hopkins School of Advanced International Studies Graduate Work 1996
 Catholic University Graduate Work 1984
 Trinity College Graduate Work 1977
 Georgetown University Graduate Work 1972
 American University Graduate Work 1967
 University of Illinois B.A. 1957

References

Year of birth missing
2010 deaths
University of Virginia alumni
George Mason University alumni
College of William & Mary alumni
Johns Hopkins University alumni
Catholic University of America alumni
Trinity Washington University alumni
Georgetown University alumni
University of Illinois Urbana-Champaign alumni
American University alumni
American educators